This article documents all major events in the sport of darts over the course of 2016.

BDO 
January
 January 2 – 10: 2016 BDO World Darts Championship in  Frimley Green
 Men's winner:  Scott Waites
 Women's winner:  Trina Gulliver
 Youth winner:  Joshua Richardson
 January 17: Quebec Open in  Drummondville
 Men's winner:  Dawson Murschell
 Women's winner:  Cindy Hayhurst
 January 22 – 24: Romanian Darts Festival in  Bucharest
 Men's Classic winner:  Jamie Hughes
 Women's Classic winner:  Anette Tillbom
 Men's Open winner:  Fabian Roosenbrand
 Women's Open winner:  Rachel Brooks
 January 22 – 24: Las Vegas Open in  Las Vegas
 Men's winner:  Benjamin Dersch
 Women's winner:  Paula Murphy
 January 29 – 31: Dutch Open in  Assen
 Men's winner:  Martin Adams
 Women's winner:  Lisa Ashton
February
 February 7: Canterbury Classic in 
 Men's winner:  Cody Harris
 Women's winner:  Tina Osborne
 February 12 – 14: Scottish Open in  Renfrew
 Men's winner:  Danny Noppert
 Women's winner:  Lorraine Winstanley
 February 20: Syracuse Open in  Syracuse
 Men's winner:  Jim Widmayer
 Women's winner:  Paula Murphy
March
 March 4 – 6: Halifax Open in 
 Men's winner:  Jeff Smith
 Women's winner:  Patricia Farrell
 March 10 – 13: Isle of Man Classic and Open in 
 Men's Classic winner:  Scott Mitchell
 Women's Classic winner:  Deta Hedman
 Men's Open winner:  Tony O'Shea
 Women's Open winner:  Lisa Ashton
 March 11 – 13: Greater Vancouver Open in 
 Men's winner:  Shawn Burt
 Women's winner:  Kim Bellay-Rouselle
 March 12 – 13: 2016 Iceland Open in 
 Men's winner:  Göran Eriksson
 Women's winner:  Elin Mortensen
 March 12 – 13: West Coast Classic in 
 Men's winner:  Koha Kokiri
 Women's winner:  Kim Kelly
 Boys' winner:  Bobby Mckeig
 Girls' winner:  Erin Dawson
 March 13 – Torremolinos Festival of Darts in  Torremolinos
 Men's winner:  Gary Tipping
 Women's winner:  Paula Jacklin
 March 18 – 20: Saint John Port City Open Dart Shoot in  Saint John
 Men's winner:  David Cameron
 Women's winner:  Patricia Farrell
 March 19: HAL Masters in  Venray
 Men's winner:  Geert De Vos
 Women's winner:  Lisa Ashton
 Boys' winner:  Justin van Tergouw
 Girls' winner:  Kyana Frauenfelder
 March 20: Hal Open in  Venray
 Men's winner:  Wesley Harms
 Women's winner:  Lisa Ashton
 Boys' winner:  Maikel Verberk
 Girls' winner:  Kyana Frauenfelder
 March 26: South Island Masters in  
 Winner:  Warren Parry
 March 26 – 27: Victorian Easter Open in 
 Men's winner:  Harley Kemp
 Women's winner:  Natalie Carter
 Boys' winner:  Colby Dodge
 Girls' winner:  Kassandra Lee
 March 26: Napoleon Games Top Of Waregem in 
 Men's winner:  Madars Razma
 Women's winner:  Anastasia Dobromyslova
 Boys' winner:  Levy Frauenfelder
 Girls' winner:  Tamara Van der Meirsch
 March 27: Napoleon Games Masters Of Waregem in 
 Men's winner:  Danny Noppert
 Women's winner:  Deta Hedman
 Boys' winner:  Justin van Tergouw
 Girls' winner:  Kyana Frauenfelder
April
 April 1 – 3: The Main Event in  Saskatoon
 Men's winner:  David Cameron
 Women's winner:  Roxanne VanTassel
 April 2: Virginia Beach Dart Classic in  Virginia Beach
 Men's winner:  Darin Young
 Women's winner:  Paula Murphy
 April 2: White Mountain Shootout in  Shelburne
 Men's winner:  Tom Sawyer
 Women's winner:  Pam Briggs
 April 8 – 10: Charlotte Open in  Charlotte
 Men's winner:  Joe Chaney
 Women's winner:  Sandy Hudson
 April 16: Bull's German Open in 
 Men's Singles winner:  Danny Noppert
 Women's Singles winner:  Aileen de Graaf
 Boys' winner:  Justin van Tergouw
 Girls' winner:  Christina Schuler
 April 17: Bull's Darts Masters in 
 Men's Singles winner:  Wesley Harms
 Women's Singles winner:  Aileen de Graaf
 April 22 – 24: Murray Bridge Grand Prix in  Adelaide
 Men's winner:  Peter Machin
 Women's winner:  Corrine Hammond
 Boys' winner:  Zaine Skelton
 Girls' winner:  Elleesha Jarrett
 April 24: North Island Masters in 
 Men's winner:  Craig Caldwell
 Women's winner:  Sha Hohipa
 April 29 – May 1: Estonia Open in 
 Men's winner:  Peter Sajwani
 Women's winner:  Kaisu Rekinen
 April 30: 2016 Denmark Open darts in 
 Men's winner:  Darius Labanauskas
 Women's winner:  Deta Hedman
May
 May 1: Denmark Masters in 
 Men's winner:  Glen Durrant
 Women's winner:  Deta Hedman
 Boys' winner:  Wessel Nijman
 Girls' winner:  Iselin Hauen
 May 6 – 8: Newfoundland & Labrador Spring Open in  St. John's
 Men's winner:  David Cameron
 Women's winner:  Patricia Farrell
 May 12 – 15: Welsh Open in  Prestatyn
 Men's winner:  Cameron Menzies
 Women's winner:  Lindsey Ashton
 May 14: Lithuania Open in 
 Men's winner:  Darius Labanauskas
 Women's winner:  Maret Liiri
 May 21: Polish Open in 
 Men's winner:  Darren Clifford
 Women's winner:  Deta Hedman
 Boys' winner:  Gijsbert van Malsem
 Girls' winner:  Veerle Hamelink
 May 21 & 22: Sunshine State Classic in  Brisbane
 Men's winner:  Raymond Smith
 Women's winner:  Corrine Hammond
 Youth winner:  Fletcher Blair
 May 22: Police Masters in 
 Men's winner:  James Hurrell
 Women's winner:  Deta Hedman
 Boys' winner:  Dennis Wunsch
 Girls' winner:  Leni Nielsen
 May 28: Finnish Open in 
 Men's winner:  Tony Alanentalo
 Women's winner:  Vicky Pruim
 Youth winner:  Otto Kekäläinen
 May 28 – 30: 2016 BDO World Trophy in  Frimley Green
 Men's winner:  Darryl Fitton
 Women's winner:  Lisa Ashton 
 May 29: Finnish Masters in 
 Men's winner:  Dennis Nilsson
 Women's winner:  Vicky Pruim
June
 June 3 – 5: Swiss Open in  Lausen
 Men's winner:  Jeffrey Sparidaans
 Women's winner:  Deta Hedman
 Youth winner:  Rusty-Jake Rodriguez
 June 3 – 6: BDO International Open in  Somerset
 Men's winner:  Nick Kenny
 Women's winner:  Lisa Ashton 
 Youth winner:  Owen Maiden
 June 5: Canterbury Open in 
 Men's winner:  Greg Moss
 Women's winner:  Sha Hohipa
 June 17 – 18: Canadian Open in  Richmond 
 Men's winner:  Kiley Edmunds
 Women's winner:  Karrah Boutilier
 June 17 – 19: England National Singles in  Selsey
 Men's winner:  Gary Robson
 Women's winner:  Deta Hedman
 June 18: Puma NZ Masters in 
 Men's winner:  Mark McGrath
 Women's winner:  Tina Osborne
 June 18 & 19: England Open in  Selsey
 Men's winner:  Glen Durrant
 Women's winner:  Deta Hedman
 June 25 – 26: Central Coast Classic  Gosford
 Men's winner:  Raymond Lane
 Women's winner:  Corrine Hammond
 June 25 – 26: Austrian Open Vienna in 
 Men's winner:  Robert Allenstein
 Women's winner:  Veronika Ihász
 Boys' winner:  Rusty-Jake Rodriguez
 Girls' winner:  Boglarka Bokor
July
 July 1 – 3: Australian Grand Masters in  Canberra
 Men's winner:  Corey Cadby
 Women's winner:  Corrine Hammond
 July 10: Japan Open  Tokyo
 Men's winner:  Seigo Asada
 Women's winner:  Fallon Sherrock
 July 30: BDO Shownights Winmau European Darts Classic in  Blackpool
 Men's winner:  Scott Waites
 Women's winner:  Anastasia Dobromyslova
 July 30: Pacific Masters in  Bendigo
 July 31: 2016 European Darts Open in  Blackpool
 Men's winner:  Glen Durrant
 Women's winner:  Lisa Ashton
 Youth winner:  Jordan Singh 
August
 August 5 – 7: Belgium Open in 
 Men's winner:  Ross Montgomery
 Women's winner:  Aileen de Graaf
 Youth winner:  Justin van Tergouw
 Girl's winner:  Layla Brussel
 August 6: USA Darts Classic in  Stamford
 Men's winner:  Tom Sawyer
 Women's winner:  Paula Murphy
 Youth winner:  Tyler Burnett
 Girl's winner:  Kaylee Roy
 August 10: New Zealand Open in  Rotorua
 Men's winner:  Cody Harris
 Women's winner:  Tina Osborne
 August 12 – 14: Antwerp Open in  Antwerp
 Men's winner:  Jimmy Hendriks
 Women's winner:  Lisa Ashton
 Youth winner:  Justin van Tergouw
 Girl's winner:  Kyana Frauenfelder
 August 19: LDO Swedish Classic in  Malmö
 Winner:  Aileen de Graaf
 August 20: Swedish Open in  Malmö
 Men's winner:  Glen Durrant
 Women's winner:  Lisa Ashton
 August 20 & 21: Hong Kong Open in 
 Men's winner:  Paolo Nebrida
 Women's winner:  Inoue Sayaka
 August 20 & 21: Van Diemen Classic Grand Prix in  Westbury
 Men's winner:  Michael Pearce 
 Women's winner:  Sandra Smith
 August 26 – 28: French Open in 
 Men's winner:  Geert De Vos
 Women's winner:  Deta Hedman
 Youth winner:  Dylan Van Beers
 August 27: LDO Ladies Classic in  Gainsborough
 Winner:  Lisa Ashton
September
 September 2 – 4: Music City Classic in  Nashville
 September 9 – 11: England Classic in  Selsey
 Men's winner:  Dean Reynolds
 Women's winner:  Deta Hedman
 September 9 – 11: England Masters in  Selsey
 Men's winner:  Glen Durrant
 Women's winner:  Deta Hedman
 Youth winner:  Tyler Radlett
 Girl's winner:  Nicolle Bidgway
 September 11: Catalonia Open Darts in  Calella
 Men's winner:  Martín Martí
 Women's winner:  Sharon Prins
 September 17: BDO British Classic in  Bridlington
 Men's winner:  Glen Durrant
 Women's winner:  Claire Brookin
 September 17: 2016 Auckland Open in 
 Men's winner:  Mark Cleaver
 Women's winner:  Jo Steed
 September 17 & 18: Baltic Cup Open in 
 Men's winner:  Dennis Nilsson
 Women's winner:  Ramona Eriksen
 September 18: BDO British Open in  Bridlington
 Men's winner:  Cameron Menzies
 Women's winner:  Deta Hedman
 September 24 & 25: North Queensland Classic in  
 Men's winner:  Raymond Smith
 Women's winner:  Corrine Hammond
 September 25: Dutch Open in  Egmond aan Zee
 Men's winner:  Martin Adams
 Women's winner:  Lisa Ashton
October
 October 7 – 9: Luxembourg Open in 
 Men's winner:  Darryl Fitton
 Women's winner:  Deta Hedman
 Youth winner:  Marvin Van Velzen
 Women's Youth winner:  Layla Brussel
 October 14 – 16: Latvia Open in  Riga
 Men's winner:  Madars Razma
 Women's winner:  Kaisu Rekinen
 Youth winner:  Rihards Slisans
 October 14 – 16: Northern Ireland Open in  Newry
 Men's winner:  Keith Rooney
 Women's winner:  Deta Hedman
 Youth winner:  Keane Barry
 October 15: Colorado Open in  Denver 
 Men's winner:  Joe Chaney
 Women's winner:  Stacey Pace
 Youth winner:  Tyler Burnett
 October 15 & 16: Australian Grand Masters in  Geelong
 Men's winner:  John Weber
 Women's winner:  Corrine Hammond
 Boy's winner:  Matt Evans
 Girl's winner:  Prosperity Nicholson
 October 19 – 26: Turkish Open in  Kemer
 Masters winners:  Umit Uygunsozlu (m) /  Aileen de Graaf (f)
 Open winners:  Martin Phillips (m) /  Aileen de Graaf (f)
 October 21 – 23: Witch City Open in  Nashua
 October 22: Alan King Memorial in  Dunedin
 Winner:  Mark McGrath
 October 22: EDO London Ladies Classic in  London
 Winner:  Anastasia Dobromyslova
 October 23: EDO London Ladies Open in  London
 Winner:  Anastasia Dobromyslova
November
 November 4 – 6: Chris Hatter Memorial in 
 Winners:  Jim Edwards (m) /  Ivy Wieshlow (f)
 November 5 & 6: Hungarian Open in  Budapest
 Open winners:  Krzysztof Ratajski (m) /  Deta Hedman (f)
 Youth winners:  Rusty-Jake Rodriguez /  Vivien Czipó (f)
 Masters winners:  Rusty-Jake Rodriguez /  Deta Hedman (f)
 November 10 – 13: Jersey Festival of darts in  Jersey
 November 12: Seacoast Open in  Andover
 Winners:  David Cameron (m) /  Trish Grzesik (f)
 November 12: Ted Clements Memorial in  Levin
 Winners:  Cody Harris (m) /  Sha Hohipa (f)
 November 15 – 17: 2016 Malta Open darts in  Buġibba
 Winners:  Paul Williams (m) /  Christine Readhead (f)
 November 18 – 20: Czech Open in  Prague
 Winners:  Andy Baetens (m) /  Anastasia Dobromyslova (f)
 Youth winners:  Romn Benecky (m) /  Vivien Czipó (f)
 November 30 – December 4: World Masters (TBD)
December 
 December 4: Darts Golden Nugget in  
 December 9 – 11: Zuiderduin Masters

PDC 
 December 17, 2015 – January 3, 2016: 2016 PDC World Darts Championship in  London
 Winner:  Gary Anderson
 January 30 & 31: 2016 Masters in  Milton Keynes
 Winner:  Michael van Gerwen
 February 12 – 14: 2016 Dutch Darts Masters in  Venray
 Winner:  Michael van Gerwen
 March 4 – 6: 2016 UK Open in  Minehead
 Winner:  Michael van Gerwen
 March 26 – 28: 2016 German Darts Masters in  Munich
 Winner:  Michael van Gerwen
 May 6 – 8: 2016 Gibraltar Darts Trophy in 
 Winner:  Michael van Gerwen
 May 13 – 15: 2016 European Darts Matchplay in  Hamburg
 Winner:  James Wade
 May 26 & 27: 2016 Dubai Duty Free Darts Masters in  Dubai
 Winner:  Gary Anderson
 June 2 – 5: 2016 PDC World Cup of Darts in  Frankfurt
 Winners: 
 June 10 – 12: 2016 Austrian Darts Open in  Vienna
 Winner:  Phil Taylor
 June 17 – 19: 2016 Auckland Darts Masters in  Auckland
 Winner:  Gary Anderson
 June 25 & 26: 2016 Shanghai Darts Masters in  Shanghai
 Winner:  Michael van Gerwen
 July 6 & 7: 2016 Tokyo Darts Masters in  Tokyo
 Winner:  Gary Anderson
 July 16 – 24: 2016 World Matchplay in  Blackpool
 Winner:  Michael van Gerwen
 July 21 – 29: 2016 European Darts Open in  Düsseldorf
 Winner:  Glen Durrant
 August 18 – 20: 2016 Sydney Darts Masters in  Sydney
 Winner:  Phil Taylor
 August 25 – 27: 2016 Perth Darts Masters in  Perth
 Winner:  Michael van Gerwen
 September 2 – 4: 2016 International Darts Open in  Riesa
 Winner:  Mensur Suljović
 September 9 – 11: 2016 European Darts Trophy in  Mülheim
 Winner:  Michael van Gerwen
 September 16 – 18: 2016 European Darts Grand Prix in  Sindelfingen
 Winner:  Michael van Gerwen
 September 24 & 25: 2016 Champions League of Darts in  Cardiff
 Winner:  Phil Taylor
 October 2 – 8: 2016 World Grand Prix in  Dublin
 Winner:  Michael van Gerwen
 October 14 – 16: 2016 German Darts Championship in  Hildesheim
 Winner:  Alan Norris
 October 28 – 30: 2016 European Championship in  Hasselt
 Winner:  Michael van Gerwen
 November 5 & 6: 2016 World Series of Darts Finals in  Glasgow
 Winner:  Michael van Gerwen
 November 12 – 20: 2016 Grand Slam of Darts in  Wolverhampton
 Winner:  Michael van Gerwen
 November 25 – 27: 2016 Players Championship Finals in  Minehead
 October 16 – November 27: 2016 PDC World Youth Championship in  Minehead

References